Valley View Mall is an enclosed shopping mall in La Crosse, Wisconsin in the United States. Valley View Mall comprises 73 stores, restaurants, and a food court. The anchor stores are Barnes & Noble and JCPenney. There are 3 vacant anchor stores: one Sears, and two Herberger's. Valley View Mall's trade area represents communities in three states with a radius of approximately  surrounding the shopping center. It is located south of Interstate 90 in one of La Crosse's largest business districts.

History
Valley View opened July 1980, with four anchor stores and more than 40 additional retailers. In 1985 the four anchor stores were Dayton's, Herberger's, Sears, and J.C. Penney. It was renovated in 1991, and a food court was added in 2001. In late 2006, a  Barnes & Noble opened at the center. On January 4, 2017,  Macy's announced that their store at the mall (the former Dayton's) would be closing as part of a plan to close 68 stores nationwide. The store closed on March 26, 2017. On April 26, 2017, it was announced that Herberger's would be relocating from their old store and expanding to the former Macy's space. The new store opened on September 14, 2017.

On April 18, 2018, it was announced that Herberger's would also be closing as parent company The Bon-Ton Stores was going out of business. The store closed on August 29, 2018. On August 22, 2018,  Sears announced that its store would be closing as well as part of a plan to close 46 stores nationwide. The store closed in November 2018. After the store closed, Barnes & Noble and JCPenney are the only remaining anchors left. March 17, 2020, Valley View Mall was closed due to the coronavirus pandemic; however it has since reopened. PREIT in August 2020 lost ownership of the mall by court order, and under foreclosure it was put up for sale the next month.

References

External links 
 Valley View Mall Official site

Buildings and structures in La Crosse, Wisconsin
Shopping malls in Wisconsin
Tourist attractions in La Crosse County, Wisconsin
Shopping malls established in 1980
1980 establishments in Wisconsin